Energy Vault is a Swiss-based, global energy storage company specializing in gravity and kinetic energy based, long-duration energy storage products. Energy Vault’s primary product is a gravity battery using a multi-headed crane to store energy by stacking heavy blocks made of composite material into a tower, capturing potential energy in the elevation gain of the blocks. When demand for electricity is high, the crane lowers these blocks to the ground, with the motors functioning as generators and delivering electricity to the grid.

History 

In 2017, Energy Vault was founded by the startup studio Idealab.

In 2019, Energy Vault secured funding from Cemex in May, before going on to secure $110m of Series B funding to become the first energy storage investment of the SoftBank Vision Fund, and won Fast Company's World Changing Idea Award for transformative utility-scale energy storage.  

In 2020, Energy Vault was Named Technology Pioneer by World Economic Forum and completed mechanical construction of the first of its kind, grid-scale customer demonstration unit which is located in Castione-Arbedo, Ticino, Switzerland.

In 2021, Energy Vault announced investments from Saudi Aramco Energy, and 100m of Series C new financing led by existing investor Prime Movers Lab, with additional participation from other existing investors including SoftBank Vision Fund, Saudi Aramco Energy Ventures, Helena, and Idealab X. In addition, the Series C funding is supported by new investors, including Pickering Energy Partners through its Energy Equity Opportunity Fund, SailingStone Global Energy Transition, A.T. Gekko, Crexa Capital Advisors LLC, Green Storage Solutions Venture I LLC, and Gordon Crawford. 

In 2022, Energy Vault Holdings, Inc. (NYSE: NRGV, NRGV WS) (“Energy Vault”), began trading on the New York Stock Exchange under ticker symbols NRGV and NRGV WS, February 14, 2022. Trading follows the successful completion of the business combination with Novus Capital Corporation II, a reverse takeover SPAC transaction that raised approximately $235 million in gross proceeds additive to its recently announced Series C of $107M and $50M license fee from Atlas Renewable to fund the execution of its growth strategy.

References

Energy storage
Economy of Ticino
Companies listed on the New York Stock Exchange